The  is a DC electric multiple unit (EMU) commuter train type operated in Japan by the private railway operator Tobu Railway since 1983.

First entering service in 1983 on the Tobu Tojo Line (1984 on the Tobu Isesaki Line), production continued through to 1995, with a total of 486 vehicles built.

Variants
The type was broadly divided into four sub-series, as follows.
 10000 series
 10030 series
 10050 series (minor variant of 10030 series)
 10080 series

10000 series
These were built to replace the remaining 7300 series trains on the Tojo Line, with the first trains entering service from 22 December 1983. 10000 series sets were also introduced on the Isesaki Line from 20 March 1984.

The corrugated stainless steel body design was based on the prototype 9000 series set built in 1981, while the front end design was derived from the earlier 8000 series EMUs. The seat covers were initially brown ("Colorado orange"), but later changed to the standard light green colour used on sets built from 1986.

Sets are configured as 2-, 6-, 8-, and 10-car sets. The four 10-car sets (11003 to 11006) used on the Tojo Line were formed in 1989 by adding two newly built intermediate cars to 8-car sets 11803 to 11806.

Two two-car sets (11201 and 11202) were transferred to the Tojo Line in May 2008 to augment the two remaining eight-car sets following the decision to run only ten-car formations on the Tojo Line from the start of the June 2008 timetable.

Total number of vehicles built: 118

Formations

10-car sets

The M1 and M4 cars are each fitted with two scissors type pantographs.

8-car sets

The M1 cars are each fitted with two scissors type pantographs.

6-car sets

The M1 and M3 cars were originally fitted with two scissors type pantographs, but these were replaced by two single-arm pantographs on the M1 cars and one single-arm pantograph on the M3 cars after refurbishment.

2-car sets

The Mc cars are fitted with two scissors type pantographs.

Refurbishment
From 2007, Isesaki Line 10000 series sets began receiving life extension refurbishment similar to that applied to the 9000 series EMUs. This involved new interiors with sculpted seats and dark blue moquette, and the addition of front-end skirts, single-arm pantographs, high-intensity headlights, and full-colour LED destination indicators.

10030 series

The 10030 subseries featured a new lightweight stainless steel body design, with a reduced number of bodyside corrugations and dull finish. A new bolsterless bogie was used. Internally, seat width was increased from 425 mm to 450 mm.

Two ten-car sets (11031 and 11032) were introduced in 1989 on the Tojo Line, the first time fixed ten-car sets had been used on Tobu overground trains.

Total number of vehicles built: 176

Formations

10-car sets

The M1 and M4 cars are each fitted with two scissors type pantographs.

Some former 4- and 6-car sets have been modified as permanently coupled 10-car sets for use on the Tojo Line.

The M1 and M3 cars are each fitted with two scissors type pantographs.

6-car sets

The M1 and M3 cars are each fitted with two scissors type pantographs.

4-car sets

The M1 cars are fitted with two scissors type pantographs.

Interior

Refurbishment

Isesaki Line 10030 series sets began receiving life extension refurbishment from 2011, with the first set returned to service in March 2011. Refurbishment involves new interiors, and the addition of front-end skirts, high-intensity headlights, and full-colour LED destination indicators.

The first refurbished pair of Tojo Line 10030 series sets, 6-car set 11641 and 4-car set 11445, entered service on 1 February 2012. The refurbished Tojo Line 4- and 6-car sets are formed as permanently coupled 10-car sets with the equipment removed from the former inner driving cabs (former KuHa 11400 and KuHa 16600 cars becoming SaHa 11400 and SaHa 16600).

10050 series

This sub-series was built from 1992 to replace non-air-conditioned 3000 series trains. The design incorporated a number of further minor changes to the previous 10030 series design.

Total number of vehicles built: 188

Formations

6-car sets

The M1 and M3 cars are each fitted with two scissors type pantographs.

4-car sets

The M1 cars are fitted with two scissors type pantographs.

2-car sets

The Mc cars are fitted with two scissors type pantographs (single-arm type on set 11267).

10080 series
Identical in outward appearance to other 10030 series sets, one 4-car set (11480) was built in 1988 to test VVVF control equipment, which was subsequently used on the 100 series Spacia EMUs and later commuter EMU types. Car 11480 of this set was experimentally repainted at Kasukabe depot for evaluation with blue/white/light blue stripes to match the colour scheme applied to the 8000 series sets, but this colour scheme was ultimately not used.

Set 11480 was refurbished in 2015, returning to service on 15 August 2015.

Formation

The M1 cars are fitted with two scissors type pantographs.

References

External links

 Tobu 10000 series 

Electric multiple units of Japan
10000 series
Train-related introductions in 1983
Alna Koki rolling stock
Tokyu Car multiple units
Fuji rolling stock
1500 V DC multiple units of Japan